Almut Hege-Schöll (born as Almut Hege) is a former German curler and curling coach.

She is a former World champion and three-time . She competed at the 1988 Winter Olympics when curling was a demonstration sport.

Awards
 Frances Brodie Award: 1990 (one and only German for today).

Teams

Record as a coach of national teams

Private life
She is from curlers family: Almut's daughter Pia-Lisa Schöll and nephew Sebastian Stock are well-known curlers too.

Married with Franz Schöll.

References

External links
 

German female curlers
Curlers at the 1988 Winter Olympics
Olympic curlers of Germany
World curling champions
European curling champions
German curling champions
German curling coaches
Year of birth missing (living people)
Living people